The 1969 Algerian Cup Final was the 7th final of the Algerian Cup. The final took place on June 12, 1969, at Stade 20 Août 1955 in Algiers with kick-off at 15:00. CR Belcourt beat USM Alger 5-3 to win their third Algerian Cup.

Pre-match

Details

Replay

References

Cup
Algeria
Algerian Cup Finals
USM Alger matches